Monte di Tremezzo is a mountain of the Lugano Prealps in Lombardy, Italy. It is the highest summit of a ridge just south of Porlezza commune, lying between Lake Lugano and Lake Como. Due to its modest height (by alpine standards) it is a relatively easy mountain to climb, but due to its great prominence it provides a good view across the lakes, and over to the High Alps; mountains as far away as Finsteraarhorn, Dom and Monte Leone can be seen on a clear day.

References

Mountains of the Alps
Mountains of Lombardy
Lugano Prealps